The 2007 Carroll Fighting Saints football team was an American football team that represented Carroll College as a member of the Frontier Conference during the 2007 NAIA football season. In their ninth season under head coach Mike Van Diest, the Saints compiled a perfect 15–0 record (10–0 against conference opponents) and won the NAIA national championship, defeating , 17–9, in the NAIA National Championship Game.

Schedule

References

Carroll
Carroll Fighting Saints football seasons
NAIA Football National Champions
College football undefeated seasons
Carroll Fighting Saints football